Kim Chol-su (born 12 September 1982) is a North Korean judoka.

He finished in joint fifth place in the lightweight (73 kg) division at the 2006 Asian Games, having lost to Rasul Boqiev of Tajikistan in the bronze medal match. At the 2009 East Asian Games he won a Bronze Medal.

He currently resides in Pyongyang.

References

External links
 
 
 2006 Asian Games profile

1982 births
Living people
North Korean male judoka
Judoka at the 2008 Summer Olympics
Olympic judoka of North Korea
Judoka at the 2006 Asian Games
Judoka at the 2010 Asian Games
Asian Games competitors for North Korea